AFAD might refer to:

Afet ve Acil Durum Yönetimi Başkanlığı, Disaster and Emergency Management Organization of Turkey
Academie de Foot Amadou Diallo, Ivorian football club